is a professional wrestling round-robin hardcore tag team tournament annually held by Big Japan Pro Wrestling (BJW), considered a spin-off of New Japan Pro-Wrestling's World Tag League and All Japan Pro Wrestling's World's Strongest Tag Determination League. The tournament was established in 1999 as Saikyo Tag League and then renamed as Big Japan Tag League in 2011 before returning to its old name Saikyo Tag League in 2014. A new format was introduced in 2014 in which the teams were divided into two blocks, "Strong Style Block" and "Deathmatch Block". The strong style block consists of normal tag team matches and deathmatch block consists of matches contested under deathmatch rules.

The Saikyo Tag League is held under a points system, with 2 points for a win, 1 for a draw and 0 for a loss. Top four teams advance to the semifinals in the knockout format and then the winning teams compete in the finals.

List of winners

Tournament history

1999
The 1999 Saikyo Tag League was the first edition of the tournament which featured four teams in one block. The tournament was held between October 27 and November 8, 1999.

2000
The 2000 Saikyo Tag League featured a new format as it had eight teams divided into two blocks with four teams in each block. The tournament was held between September 17 and October 30, 2000.

2001
The 2001 Saikyo Tag League consisted of one block with five teams and was held between September 11 and September 23, 2001.

2002
The 2002 Saikyo Tag League consisted of total ten teams and two blocks with five teams in each block. The tournament was held between October 8 and October 31, 2002.

2003
The 2003 Saikyo Tag League consisted of one block with five teams and was held between October 8 and November 8, 2003.

2009
The 2009 Saikyo Tag League was the sixth edition of the tournament which marked the return of the tournament after a six-year hiatus. It was held between February 13 and May 28, 2009.

Masato Tanaka was a replacement for the injured Mammoth Sasaki.

2011
The 2011 Big Japan Tag League was held between September 19 and November 22, 2011.

2012
The 2012 Big Japan Tag League was held between September 25 and November 24, 2012.

2013
The 2013 Saikyo Tag League was held between September 25 and November 22, 2013.

2014
The 2014 Saikyo Tag League featured twelve teams and two blocks with six tag teams in each block. The tournament featured a new format in which one block was named "Strong Style Block" which consisted of matches contested under strong style format and the other block was named "Deathmatch Block" in which matches were contested under deathmatch format. The tournament was held between September 20 and November 21, 2014.

2015
The 2015 Saikyo Tag League featured twelve teams and two blocks with six tag teams in each block. The tournament was held between September 21 and October 29, 2015.

2016
The 2016 Saikyo Tag League featured a unique format as it featured four blocks with each block consisting of four tag teams. Two blocks were Strong Style blocks and two were Deathmatch blocks in the tournament. The tournament was held between September 4 and October 31, 2016.

2017
The 2017 Saikyo Tag League featured twelve teams and two blocks with six tag teams in each block. The tournament was held between September 6 and October 15, 2017.

2018
The 2018 Saikyo Tag League featured a total of fourteen teams with seven teams in each block. The tournament took place between August 12 and October 25, 2018.

2019
The 2019 Saikyo Tag League featured a total of fourteen teams with seven teams in each block. The tournament took place between September 1 and November 26, 2019.

See also
List of Big Japan Pro Wrestling tournaments

References

External links
 Big Japan Pro Wrestling official website

1999 establishments in Japan
Big Japan Pro Wrestling
Tag team tournaments